Vadim Aleksandrovich Kirichenko (born 7 February 1936) is a retired Soviet football player and manager.

Player career
He made his debut in the Soviet First League in 1957 for Spartak/Alga Frunze.

Coach career
In his early career Kirichenko worked at the club Alga Frunze. Since 1968, he coached Zarafshan Navoiy, Spartak Ivano-Frankivsk, Lokomotiv Kherson and Terek Grozny.

References

External links
 

1936 births
Living people
Russian footballers
Soviet footballers
Soviet football managers
FC Alga Bishkek players
FC Alga Bishkek managers
FC Spartak Ivano-Frankivsk managers
FC Krystal Kherson managers
FC Akhmat Grozny managers

Association football defenders